A Woman Alone (Italian: Donne sole) is a 1956 Italian drama film directed by Vittorio Sala and Ottavio Alessi assistant director, and starring Eleonora Rossi Drago, Luciana Angiolillo and Ettore Manni.

Cast
 Eleonora Rossi Drago as Luisa
 Luciana Angiolillo as Nice
 Ettore Manni as Giulio, il giornalista
 Antigone Costanda as Franca
 Gianna Maria Canale as Mara
 Paolo Stoppa 
 Evi Maltagliati as Pressenda
 Joseph Lenzi as Dino Franceschi
 Ignazio Leone as Turi
 Francesco Sormano 
 Matilde Orsini 
 Vittorio Vaser 
 Gino Buzzanca 
 Giorgio Gandos 
 Franca Ferrari 
 Francisco Prosperi 
 Ugo Ugolini
 Enzo Garinei as Ciccio, il fotografo
Ottavio Alessi as the movie Cinematographer

References

Bibliography
 Lino Miccichè. Storia del cinema italiano: 1954-1959. Edizioni di Bianco & Nero, 2001.

External links

1956 films
1956 drama films
Italian drama films
1950s Italian-language films
Films directed by Vittorio Sala
1950s Italian films